Jasmina Suter (born 16 April 1995) is a Swiss alpine ski racer.

Season standings

World Championship results

References

External links
 

1995 births
Living people
Swiss female alpine skiers
Alpine skiers at the 2012 Winter Youth Olympics
21st-century Swiss women